Money Plane is a 2020 American action film directed by Andrew Lawrence and starring Adam Copeland, Kelsey Grammer, Thomas Jane, and Denise Richards. It was released to video-on-demand services on July 10, 2020, by Quiver Distribution.

Plot
Jack Reese, a professional thief and former gambler, attempts to steal the (fictional) Asger Jorn painting The Disturbing Duckling from an art museum with the help of his crew of Isabella Voltaic, Trey Peterson and Iggy. When Reese enters the museum, he finds out that the painting is no longer there and that he and his team have been compromised. They are forced to flee empty-handed.

Without any other options, Jack goes to confront notorious gang leader Darius "The Rumble" Grouch at his house, who hired Reese and his crew for the heist in the first place. Already in debt to Darius before the botched heist (and under the threat of harm to his family), Reese takes one more job from him to clear his debt: to sneak aboard the "Money Plane," an airborne casino that caters to elite criminals, in order to steal its reserves of cryptocurrency and hard cash. The night before embarking on the heist, Reese asks his best friend Harry Greer to keep an eye on his family while he is gone; Greer also offers to look into how the museum heist got compromised.

Jack and Trey board the plane under the guises of human traffickers Monroe and McGillicuddy while Isabella poses as one of the flight attendants. As the plane takes off, the Concierge and Bookkeeper welcome their guests, explaining the activities and amenities on board while informing them of the plane's zero-tolerance stance on cheating. After several hands of Texas hold 'em poker, Jack leaves Trey in the main gambling room to subdue the pilots and take control of the plane. While Trey improbably wins a series of games on the plane (including Russian roulette and betting on the outcome of a fight between a man and a cobra), Jack establishes contact with Iggy, who is on the ground to facilitate the transfer of the plane's cryptocurrency, as well as taking calls from Darius who demands to be kept in the loop with the mission and reminds Reese of the consequences should the team fail.

Isabella breaks off to secure the money in the plane's vault, getting into a fight with a guard whom she kills before he can blow her cover. Jack calls Harry while in-air, who reveals that the painting Jack's crew failed to steal was already owned by Darius and that they are being set up to fail. In too deep to back out, Jack and the crew elect to keep going with the heist while asking Harry to work on a "fail-safe" measure on the ground.

Trey and Isabella work on securing the server room where the cryptocurrency is stored, and Iggy establishes a secure link between him and the plane to start transferring the cryptocurrency. However, the team on the plane are attacked by two of the Money Plane's guests who caught wind of their actions, and Iggy is ambushed by assassins who are implied to be on Grouch's payroll. Trey and Isabella manage to fight off and kill their attackers, while Iggy is saved by a handgun-toting drone piloted by Harry. However, the servers have been damaged during the fight, forcing them to download the cryptocurrency onto a USB drive, which if used, would alert the Money Plane to the breach.

Harry guns down a team of assassins sent to Jack's home, while the team in the plane decide to not keep any of the money and instead donate it to charitable causes around the world, with special focus on those affected by guests of the Money Plane. Jack makes one final call to Darius, who is angered by the team's betrayal, but is stunned when Jack reveals he has played a clip of Darius stating his identity and his intentions to rob the Money Plane over the plane's radio, sealing his fate. The team escapes the plane via an emergency exit door while letting the cash money fall out of it, while the Money Plane has assassins sent to Darius' house to kill him.

Three months after the Money Plane heist, two warehouse workers in Istanbul open a painting shipping case only to find out that the artwork inside has been stolen and replaced. Back home, it is revealed that Jack and his crew have stolen The Disturbing Duckling and that the price has been driven up to 60 million dollars, which Jack has split up five ways between him, his crew and Harry, ensuring that they all have enough money to retire.

Cast
 Adam Copeland as Jack Reese
 Kelsey Grammer as Darius Emanuel Grouch III, aka "The Rumble"
 Thomas Jane as Harry Greer
 Denise Richards as Sarah
 Katrina Norman as Isabella Voltaic
 Patrick Lamont Jr. as Trey Peterson
 Andrew Lawrence as Iggy
 Joey Lawrence as The Concierge
 Matthew Lawrence as The Cowboy
 Al Sapienza as The Bookkeeper

Production
Inspired by heist movies such as Ocean's Eleven, airplane movies such as Con Air, and their experiences in Las Vegas, producers Switzer and Konney turned to Andrew Lawrence. Lawrence proposed an airplane casino movie, which Switzer and Konney agreed to fund after Lawrence wrote a screenplay. After securing Adam Copeland for the role of Jack Reese, the producers cast Thomas Jane as Reese's mentor. Kelsey Grammer was their first casting choice for Darius Grouch, though they did not expect him to accept the role. To their surprise, Grammer accepted, later saying that the role "seemed like a fun, mustache-twirling kind of character."

Principal photography began in October 2019 and continued through late December. After plans to film in Romania and Toronto proved unworkable, the production moved to Baton Rouge. The project's low budget and rushed schedule frequently required Lawrence to improvise and to adjust shooting based on which sets were available: "We were literally building the plane set while we were shooting ... We picked corners of the set that were built, and shot in those corners. We had to do that all the time," he said. After post-production early in the year, the film was released in July 2020.

Reception
Money Plane received an overall negative critical reception. The Daily Beast described Money Plane as "the dumbest movie of 2020". The Action Elite gave the film 2.5 stars out of 5 and called it "the kind of movie that will likely be forgotten about within a matter of weeks". A review from Decider said that it was "the best and worst of what a bad movie experience can be". Red Letter Media reviewed the film in extreme detail on an episode of Half in the Bag. They derided its script, performances, and production value, conceding that the only positive is that it's "a new movie" amidst the COVID-19 pandemic.

References

External links
 
 
 
 

2020 films
2020 action films
2020s English-language films
2020s heist films
American action films
American aviation films
American heist films
Films set on airplanes
Films about gambling
Quiver Distribution films
2020s American films